Kwiambal is a national park in New South Wales, Australia located about 30 km from the town of Ashford. The Severn River and Macintyre River both flow through and finally converge in the park below the MacIntyre falls. The park is studded with granite outcrops and also features the Ashford Caves.

This secluded nature reserve near Inverell offers cheap accommodation, great places for picnics, swimming, mountain biking, fishing and bird watching.

References

See also
 Protected areas of New South Wales

National parks of New South Wales
2000 establishments in Australia